Krasnoilsk (or ) is an urban-type settlement in Chernivtsi Raion (district) of Chernivtsi Oblast in the west of Ukraine. It hosts the administration of Krasnoilsk settlement hromada, one of the hromadas of Ukraine. Population: 

Until 18 July 2020, Krasnoilsk belonged to Storozhynets Raion. The raion was abolished in July 2020 as part of the administrative reform of Ukraine, which reduced the number of raions of Chernivtsi Oblast to three. The area of Storozhynets Raion was merged into Chernivtsi Raion.

Krasnoilsk is located 8 km from the Ukrainian border with Romania and according to the 2001 Ukrainian census, the settlement had 9,142 people , out of which almost all are ethnic Romanians.

References

External links
Krasnoilsk, at the portal of the Verkhovna Rada of Ukraine.
Malanka (Old New Year Carnival celebration 2010 

Urban-type settlements in Chernivtsi Raion
Bukovina
Romanian communities in Ukraine